Beast (often stylised as BEAST) is a garage rock supergroup from Cape Town. Formed in 2012, the band consists of Inge Beckmann (vocals) of Lark, Louis Nel (bass guitar) and Rian Zietsman (bass guitar) of Taxi Violence, and Werner von Waltsleben (drums) of Kobus!. BEAST's sound has been self-described as "psychological rock and roll" and a "four-nippled aberration".

They have become known for their energetic live performances. Their self-released debut album, Smoke Swig Swear, was met with local critical acclaim.

History

Formation and Smoke Swig Swear (2011-13)
In late 2011, with a mutual desire to learn bass, Rian Zietsman and Louis Nel (guitarist and drummer of Taxi Violence, respectively) purchased two bass guitars and began practising in the basement of a house they shared. Rian described these early sessions as experiment, because "no one had tried [the two-bass set-up] before". Early into the experiment, the duo approached Sasha Righini (drummer of The Plastics) to join them and, later, he became a full member of the group. Soon after, they booked their first performance under the band name "Kombass". This early name is a word play on the Afrikaans word "kombuis", which translates to kitchen.

After recording their first session at Kill City Blues Studios, Rian and Louis set out to find a female vocalist. Inge Beckmann (vocalist of Lark) was in touch with Rian and Louis during the experimentation phase, but only wanted to invite her when "the sound was right". It was after announcing Lark's "semi-permanent" hiatus, Inge joined the band for their first live performance. She originally wanted to change the band name to "Bow Beast", as she enjoyed the " interesting visual effect in [her] mind". The band eventually settled on the name BEAST.

BEAST recorded its debut album, Smoke Swig Swear, over four days in September 2012 at Sound and Motion Studios in Cape Town. It was self-released as a free download to widespread local critical acclaim. The album had its official launch at The Assembly in Cape Town on 23 February 2013. Two weeks after the launch, the band released a short experimental documentary on Vimeo. It chronicles their rehearsals, recording session and live performances to create an "authentic look at the personalities behind the music". Before and after the success of their album launch, the band toured South Africa extensively. Their notable performance on the main stage at Oppikoppi, Up The Creek, Rocking The Daises, and Splashy Fen.

Line-up change, crowdfunding, and Bardo (2013-present)
In mid-2013, Sasha left the band to pursue his own music. The band invited Werner von Waltsleben (drummer of Kobus!) to join the band. In an interview, he spoke about his fantism for both Taxi Violence and Lark, explaining it "was like a dream come true" to play "the music [he] wanted too".

On 13 August 2014, the band announced on their Facebook fan page, the start of their crowdfunding on Indiegogo to raise money for their second album. The band had not signed to any major label, as their original bands had done. On their Indiegogo page, the band wrote about the importance of artistic and creative freedom, but noted that "the kind of quality album [they] want is going to be difficult" without a major label monetary support. The campaign was unsuccessful, they raised  of their  goal.

After falling short of their goal, the band was approached by a private investor who "helped tremendously". The band recorded their album in October 2014 at Heritage Sound in Cape Town, with producer Brendyn Rossouw. The second album, Bardo, was launched at The Assembly in Cape Town on 27 February 2015. The album's theme focuses on the Tibetan Buddhism state of Bardo, between life and death. Inge was inspired by reading Charlie Morley's book Dreams of Awakening. The album received critical acclaim for its "professionalism", with one critic describing it as "[transcending] the point of being a mere piece of music".

Musical style

Instrumentation
The twin-bass setup is fairly unusual to the South African music scene. Zietsman plays in lower key as the rhythm, akin to a normal bassist. Nel employs a higher chord-based approach as the lead, akin to a lead guitar. The perform with a bass and normal guitar amp to create a "rawer, harder, and more low-fi sound".

Members
Principal members
 Inge Beckmann – vocals 
 Rian Zietsman – bass guitar 
 Louis Nel – bass guitar 
 Werner von Waltsleben – drums 

Past members
 Sasha Righini – drums

Discography
Studio albums
 Smoke Swig Swear (2012)
 Bardo (Beast album)|Bardo (2015)

Videography
  (2012)
  (2013)
  (2013)
  (2014)

References

External links 
 
 
 

South African hard rock musical groups
Rock music supergroups
2012 establishments in South Africa
Musical groups established in 2012
Garage rock groups